Songs of Innocence and of Experience is a collection of illustrated poems by William Blake. It appeared in two phases: a few first copies were printed and illuminated by Blake himself in 1789; five years later, he bound these poems with a set of new poems in a volume titled Songs of Innocence and of Experience Shewing the Two Contrary States of the Human Soul. Blake was also a painter before the creation of Songs of Innocence and Experience and had painted such subjects as Oberon, Titania, and Puck dancing with fairies.

"Innocence" and "Experience" are definitions of consciousness that rethink Milton's existential-mythic states of "Paradise" and "Fall". Often, interpretations of this collection centre around a mythical dualism, where "Innocence" represents the "unfallen world" and "Experience" represents the "fallen world". Blake categorizes our modes of perception that tend to coordinate with a chronology that would become standard in Romanticism: childhood is a state of protected innocence rather than original sin, but not immune to the fallen world and its institutions. This world sometimes impinges on childhood itself, and in any event becomes known through "experience", a state of being marked by the loss of childhood vitality, by fear and inhibition, by social and political corruption and by the manifold oppression of Church, State and the ruling classes. The volume's "Contrary States" are sometimes signalled by patently repeated or contrasted titles: in Innocence, Infant Joy, in Experience, Infant Sorrow; in Innocence, The Lamb, in Experience, The Fly and The Tyger. The stark simplicity of poems such as The Chimney Sweeper and The Little Black Boy display Blake's acute sensibility to the realities of poverty and exploitation that accompanied the "Dark Satanic Mills" of the Industrial Revolution.

Songs of Innocence

Songs of Innocence was originally a complete work first printed in 1789. It is a conceptual collection of 483 poems, engraved with artwork. This collection mainly shows happy, innocent perception in pastoral harmony, but at times, such as in "The Chimney Sweeper" and "The Little Black Boy", subtly shows the dangers of this naïve and vulnerable state.

Songs of Experience

Songs of Experience is a poetry collection of 26 poems forming the second part of William Blake's Songs of Innocence and of Experience. The poems were published in 1794 (see 1794 in poetry).  Some of the poems, such as "The Little Girl Lost" and "The Little Girl Found", were moved by Blake to Songs of Innocence and were frequently moved between the two books.

The poems are listed below:

Introduction
Earth's Answer
The Clod and the Pebble
Holy Thursday
The Little Girl Lost
The Little Girl Found
The Chimney Sweeper
Nurse's Song
The Sick Rose
The Fly
The Angel
The Tyger
My Pretty Rose Tree
Ah! Sun-flower
The Lilly
The Garden of Love
The Little Vagabond
London
The Human Abstract
Infant Sorrow
A Poison Tree
A Little Boy Lost
A Little Girl Lost
To Tirzah
The School Boy
The Voice of the Ancient Bard

Musical settings

Poems from both books have been set to music by many composers, including Ralph Vaughan Williams, Joseph Holbrooke, John Frandsen, Per Drud Nielsen, Sven-David Sandström, Benjamin Britten, and Jacob ter Veldhuis. Individual poems have also been set by, among others, John Tavener, Victoria Poleva, Jah Wobble, Tangerine Dream, Jeff Johnson, and Daniel Amos. A modified version of the poem "The Little Black Boy" was set to music in the song "My Mother Bore Me" from Maury Yeston's musical Phantom. The folk musician Greg Brown recorded sixteen of the poems on his 1987 album Songs of Innocence and of Experience and by Finn Coren in his Blake Project.

The poet Allen Ginsberg believed the poems were originally intended to be sung, and that through study of the rhyme and metre of the works, a Blakean performance could be approximately replicated. In 1969, he conceived, arranged, directed, sang on, and played piano and harmonium for an album of songs entitled Songs of Innocence and Experience by William Blake, tuned by Allen Ginsberg (1970).

American composer and producer David Axelrod produced two solo albums, Song of Innocence (1968) and Songs of Experience (1969) which were homages to the mystical poetry and paintings of William Blake.

The composer William Bolcom completed a setting of the entire collection of poems in 1984. In 2005, a recording of Bolcom's work by Leonard Slatkin, the Michigan State Children's Choir, and the University of Michigan on the Naxos label won four Grammy Awards: Best Choral Performance, Best Classical Contemporary Composition, Best Classical Album, and Best Producer of the Year (classical).

The composer Victoria Poleva completed "Songs of Innocence and of Experience" in 2002, a chamber cycle on the verses by Blake for soprano, clarinet and accordion. It was first performed by the ensemble Accroche-Note of France.

Popular group Tangerine Dream based their album Tyger on lyrics by William Blake.

Popular rock group U2 released an album called Songs of Innocence in 2014, and followed it in 2017 with Songs of Experience.

Karl Jenkins' Motets includes a setting of The Shepherd.

The fictional rock band Infant Sorrow, as featured in the 2008 film Forgetting Sarah Marshall, appears to be named after the Blake poem.

Facsimile editions

The Huntington Library and Art Gallery in San Marino, California, published a small facsimile edition in 1975 that included sixteen plates reproduced from two copies of Songs of Innocence and of Experience in their collection, with an introduction by James Thorpe. The songs reproduced were Introduction, Infant Joy, The Lamb, Laughing Song and Nurse's Song from Songs of Innocence, and Introduction, The Clod & the Pebble, The Tyger, The Sick Rose, Nurses Song and Infant Sorrow from Songs of Experience.  Tate Publishing, in collaboration with The William Blake Trust, produced a folio edition containing all of the songs of Innocence and Experience in 2006. A colour plate of each poem is accompanied by a literal transcription, and the volume is introduced by critic and historian Richard Holmes.

William Blake, Songs of Innocence and of Experience edited with an introduction and notes by Andrew Lincoln, and select plates from other copies.  Blake's Illuminated Books, vol. 2.  William Blake Trust / Princeton University Press, 1991.  Based on King's College, Cambridge, copy, 1825 or later.

Songs of Innocence  Dover Publications, 1971.  Based on copy of Lessing J. Rosenwald Collection, Library of Congress, Copy B, ca. 1790.

Songs of Experience  Dover Publications, 1984.  Based on "a rare 1826 etched edition," per back cover.

Notes

References

External links

Multiple digital copies of Blake's illustrated versions of the Songs of Innocence and of Experience at the William Blake Archive
Songs of Innocence and of Experience (1794), from Rare Book Room
Songs of Innocence and of Experience (1826), from Rare Book Room
Link to Ginsberg recordings of the poems
 

 
English poetry collections
Artists' books
English art
Self-published books
1789 poetry books
1794 poetry books
18th-century illuminated manuscripts
Books about cats